Zhang Zhaozhong is a Chinese military theorist and admiral.

Zhang Zhaozhong may also refer to:

Zhang Zhaozhong, a character from The Book and the Sword, including in:
The Emperor and His Brother, 1981 film
Book and Sword Chronicles, 1984 TV
The Book and the Sword (1992 TV series)
The Book and the Sword (1994 TV series)
The Romance of Book and Sword, 1987 film
Princess Fragrance (film), 1987
Book and Sword, Gratitude and Revenge, 2002 TV
The Book and the Sword (2008 TV series)